Another Dawn may refer to:

Another Dawn (1937 film), American film starring Errol Flynn, Kay Francis and Ian Hunter
Another Dawn (1943 film), Mexican film starring Andrea Palma, Pedro Armendáriz and Alberto Galán
Another Dawn (album), 2010 release by the band Tempest

See also
Always Another Dawn, 1948 Australian film starring Charles Tingwell